The 2007 European heat wave affected most of Southern Europe and the Balkans. The phenomenon began affecting Italy and Turkey on 17 June and expanded into Greece and the rest of the Balkans, Hungary and Ukraine on 18 June. The costs of the heat wave were estimated at 2 billion euros.

April 2007 
It was also the first calendar month without any measured precipitation since February 1959.

June 2007 
From this point on Greece, Italy, Albania, Bulgaria, Serbia, Croatia, Bosnia and Herzegovina, Romania and Turkey experienced record-breaking temperatures in a situation unprecedented even for these nations, typically used to conditions of extreme heat.

By 26 June, however, Greece seemed to bear the brunt of the heatwave with temperatures in Athens reaching . The same day, Greece's national power consumption set a new record. Parts of Greece, including neighbourhoods in Athens, suffered from power outages due to high electricity demand and heat damage to the grid. Explosions from overheating transmission towers were implicated in the forest fires ravaging the country.

More than 200 people were hospitalized for heat-related treatment and 18 people died from heat exhaustion. By 28 June northerly winds started blowing from the northwest and temperatures finally began falling, reaching a cooler . Nonetheless, at a time when everyone believed that the worst part was over, more than 100 fires erupted across the country. Two people perished in the village of Aghia, near the city of Larissa. In the evening of that same day a major wildfire broke out in Mount Parnitha near Athens. By the dawn of 29 June, a significant part of the popular Parnitha National Park had turned into ashes.

July 2007 
From 21 to 25 July, temperatures reached or exceeded . Over 500 deaths in Hungary were attributed to the heatwave. Major wildfires destroyed large forested areas across the region. Six people (including two Canadair pilots) lost their lives while trying to extinguish the flames in Greece. The country's electricity grid nearly collapsed due to exceptional demand for air conditioning. Hundreds of tourists were stranded on the beaches of Apulia, in Southeastern Italy, and had to be rescued by boats.

In Bulgaria, six people were killed in the fires that started on 22 July. An estimated 1,530 fires broke out between 20 and 24 July, three times the yearly average. During the largest fire near Stara Zagora,  of pine forest burned for three days, as firefighters were unable to control the fire by conventional means. Strong winds and the extremely dry air quickly sparked new fires. The government requested help from Russia, and Be-200 amphibious water bombers finally managed to contain the blaze near Stara Zagora.

August 2007

In the beginning of August, the Dalmatian coast in Croatia was hit by severe fires, especially in the surroundings of Dubrovnik.

See also 
 2007 Greek forest fires
 2007 Asian heat wave

References

Notes

Sources

External links 
Central/Eastern Europe: Heat Wave - Jul 2007 on ReliefWeb

European heat wave
European heat wave, 2007
June 2007 events in Europe
July 2007 events in Europe
Heat waves in Europe